Nemoura arctica is a species of spring stonefly in the family Nemouridae.

Locations
It is found in North America, temperate Asia, and Europe.

Taxonomic synonyms
Nemoura trispinosa, the "three-spined forestfly", has been identified as a taxonomic synonym of this species.

References

Nemouridae
Articles created by Qbugbot
Insects described in 1923